Renate Hoffleit (born 1950 in Stuttgart) is a German sculptor and artist. She lives and works mainly in Stuttgart, Germany.

Biography 

Renate Hoffleit studied graphics, free graphic art and sculpture at the Staatliche Akademie der Bildenden Künste, Stuttgart. From 1979 onwards, she developed her marble and light sculptures, and since 1987 she has created square design, sculptures and fountains in public spaces. She started her site-specific audio-visual installation Vertonungen  in 1992. Since 1993, she has been working with   Michael Bach Bachtischa  creating site-specific sound installations and string installations, accompanied by performances.

Exhibitions 
Renate Hoffleit's works are on display at home and abroad.

Works exhibited in museums and public collections 
 Württembergische Staatsgalerie Stuttgart
 Ministerium für Wissenschaft und Kunst, Stuttgart
 Deutsche Akademie Villa Massimo, Rome
 Djerassi Foundation, Woodside (Kalifornien), USA
 The Hakone Open-Air Museum Tokyo, Japan
 Informationsbüro des Landes Baden-Württemberg, Brussels
 Städtische Kunsthalle Mannheim
 Städtische Museen Heilbronn, Germany
 Städtische Kunsthalle Recklinghausen, Germany
 Kunstsammlung Lütze Sindelfingen, Germany
 Kunstsammlung der Stadt Fellbach, Germany
 Landratsamt Böblingen, Germany

Works in public spaces 

 Skulpturenfeld, Amts- und Landessozialgericht, Stuttgart
 Stufenanlange mit 8 Wasser / Klang-Säulen, Kornwestheim
 Wasserklangbrunnen Magstadter Duo, Magstadt
 Vier-Säulen-Brunnen and Wandbrunnen, Klinik Löwenstein, Germany
 Konvex / Konkav (2/III), main station Heilbronn
 Stufenanlage mit 8 Türmen, Kornwestheim, Germany

Landscape-related works 
 Feuer Im Sequoia, Djerassi Foundation, California, USA
 alb-eier, Schwäbische Alb, „Der Grosse Alb-Gang“, Landkreis Esslingen, Germany
 Konvex / Konkav (1/III), Hakone Open Air Museum, Japan
 Mittags-Stele in the Exotic Garden of the University in Hohenheim, Germany
 Convexe / Concave La Tour, estate near Nice, France
 Wiesen-Eier, Das Goldene Ei Aichtal (Sculptoura), Landkreis Böblingen, Germany

Audio-visual works 
 Leben ist Laut – Vertonungen außen-innen-außen, Donaueschinger Musiktage, 2000
 Seefelder Vertonungen, Klangprojekt Hörfeld, Schloss Seefeld, 2004
 Urspring, Waves, Festival KlangRaum Stuttgart, 2011

String Installations 

In collaboration with Michael Bach Bachtischa
  One8 and 15 Strings, Donaueschinger Musiktage, 1994
  Notrepos, Schloss Monrepos, Ludwigsburg, Germany, 1995
  Achill Strings, Achill Island, Irland, 1996
  Traffic Tubes and Soloists, Treffpunkt Rotebühlplatz, Stuttgart, 1997
  EFeu-Klänge, Stadtgalerie Saarbrücken, 1997
  Strings of Kaukab Spring, Misgav Festival, Israel, 1998
  ... die Leere zwischen den Steinen klingt ..., Skulpturenfeld, Stuttgart, 1999
  Le Chien Noir, Abey in Murbach, France, Festival Printemps Rhénan, 2000
  Schloss Kapfenburg besaitet ..., Opening Ceremony of the Internationale Musikschulakademie Kulturzentrum Schloss Kapfenburg, Germany, 2000 (Guinness-Buch der Rekorde [1])
  Strings and Pillars, Opening Ceremony of the Fuchu Art Museum, Tokyo, 2000
  Jungfernfahrt, Festival Berlin Biennale 2001, Berlin
  Habichtswaldsaiten, Festival Tonale 2011, Kassel
  genius loci gehört und genius loci concertante, Domnick Foundation, Nürtingen, 2014 (Project Garten Eden of the KulturRegion Stuttgart)
  (zwischen e und f)², Stadtbibliothek Stuttgart, 2015

Awards, prizes and scholarships  

For her artistic work, Renate Hoffleit obtained scholarships from the Kunstfonds e.V., Bonn foundation and Kunststiftung Baden-Wuerttemberg as well as scholarships for study visits at the Deutsche Akademie Villa Massimo Casa Baldi, Olevano, Italy, and the Djerassi Foundation, USA, among others. She received the Utsukushi-ga-hara Museum Award, Japan, for her Konvex-Konkav sculpture made of light-reflecting, polished bronze. For their audio projects, Renate Hoffleit and Michael Bach Bachtischa obtained support from the Irish Arts Council, Ireland, the Heinrich-Böll-Stiftung and the Innovationsfonds Kunst Baden-Wuerttemberg, among others.

References

External links 

 
 Renate Hoffleit
 Saiteninstallationen

Gallery 

1950 births
Living people
Actresses from Stuttgart